Valió la Pena ("It was Worth it") is the sixth Spanish album and eighth studio album by Marc Anthony. Anthony is reunited with Producer Sergio George on their first collaborative work since 1995's Todo A Su Tiempo album.

The album contains seven songs from Anthony's previous album, Amar Sin Mentiras, in a salsa arrangement and adds Rafael Hernández's classic "Lamento Borincano." Like the previous album, Valió la Pena also peaked #1 at Top Latin Albums. The album was awarded Best Salsa Album at the 2005 Latin Grammy Awards and "Tropical Album of the Year" at the Premio Lo Nuestro 2005 awards.

Track listing
 Valió la Pena
 Escapémonos (duet with Jennifer Lopez)
 Ahora Quien
 Tu Amor Me Hace Bien
 Volando Entre Tus Brazos
 Amigo
 Se Esfuma Tu Amor
 Lamento Borincano

Charts

Weekly charts

Year-end charts

Sales and certifications

See also
List of number-one Billboard Top Latin Albums of 2004
List of number-one Billboard Tropical Albums from the 2000s

References

Marc Anthony albums
2004 albums
Sony BMG Norte albums
Columbia Records albums
Albums produced by Sergio George
Latin Grammy Award for Best Salsa Album

Spanish-language albums